BU72 is an extremely potent opioid, with one of the highest known affinities for the μ-opioid receptor. In animal studies, it was found to be a potent analgesic, with a slow onset and long duration of action, but was not considered suitable to develop for medical use. It was used to produce the first crystal structure of the active μ-opioid receptor, and is now widely used to model the activation process. The stereochemistry has recently been revised, with the phenyl group  in the (R) configuration, which has been accepted by the authors of the crystal structure.

See also 
 7-PET
 Buprenorphine
 BU-48
 BU08028

References 

Mu-opioid receptor agonists
Nitrogen heterocycles
Heterocyclic compounds with 6 rings